Scopula antiloparia is a moth of the family Geometridae. It was described by Wallengren in 1863. It is endemic to Namibia.

Taxonomy
The species is possibly a junior synonym of Scopula minorata, based on genital examination of type material at The Natural History Museum, London, and Universitets Zoologiska Institut, Uppsala, Sweden. Prout suggested that it could be conspecific with Scopula sincera based on a description of A. antiloparia, not on examination of the types.

References

Moths described in 1863
antiloparia
Endemic fauna of Namibia
Taxa named by Hans Daniel Johan Wallengren
Moths of Africa